Black Fury is the name of several fictional comic book characters published in the Golden Age of Comics.

John Perry
The first Black Fury premiered in Fox Feature Syndicate's Fantastic Comics #17 (April 1941). This version was created by artists Dennis Neville and Mark Howell. Black Fury is the alter ego of John Perry, gossip columnist for the Daily Clarion. Perry uses his newspaper connections to uncover information on crime and corruption, which he fights in his costumed form. He has no superpowers, and is assisted by Chuck Marley, the son of a slain policeman. The Black Fury and Chuck capture the Fang, who murdered Chuck's father.

The Fox Black Fury character appeared in eight issues of Fantastic Comics until issue #23 (Nov 1941), and also appeared in V...- Comics''' #1-2 (Jan-March 1942) and Blue Beetle #12 (June 1942).

Rex King
The second Black Fury appeared in Super-Magic Comics #1 (May 1941), published by Street & Smith Publications. There were no writing or artists credited. Black Fury is the secret identity of Rex King, a costumed adventurer who can glide through the air, using the wing-like underarm flaps of his costume. He defends the jungles of Africa with the help of his pet black panther, Kato.

Female criminal
The third Black Fury was created by Matt Baker, and debuted in Fox Feature Syndicate's Zoot #9 (Oct. 1947). This was a female criminal who used trained black panthers to battle the jungle goddess Rulah. She appeared in a story entitled "Fangs of Black Fury".

Charlton Comics

The fourth Black Fury debuted in Charlton Comics' Black Fury #1 (May 1955). This character was a horse that roamed the West righting wrongs, bearing some resemblance to the 1955–1960 NBC Saturday-morning TV series Fury'' (for which Dell Publishing released a tie-in comic-book series). The Charlton comic featured artwork by Dick Giordano and Rocco "Rocke" Mastroserio and lasted 58 issues.

See also
 Miss Fury, another Golden Age superhero known as "the Black Fury" for the first six months of her comic strip

References

External links
 
 
 

Golden Age superheroes
American comics characters
Comics characters introduced in 1947
Comics characters introduced in 1955
Comics characters introduced in 1991
Charlton Comics characters
Charlton Comics titles
Black Fury
Protectors characters
Jungle superheroes